The Laboratory of Parallel and Distributed Systems (LPDS), as a department of MTA SZTAKI, is a research laboratory in distributed grid and cloud technologies. LPDS is a founding member of the Hungarian Grid Competence Centre, the Hungarian National Grid Initiative, and the Hungarian OpenNebula Community and also coordinates several European grid/cloud projects.

The mission of LPDS is twofold. On one hand, we would like to provide efficient software development tools and high-level services together with customizable scientific gateways. On the other hand, LPDS is developing easy-to-maintain middleware solutions and technologies for interoperability that enables cost-efficient alternative distributed, grid, and cloud platforms for scientific and business applications.

LPDS laboratory, in cooperation with other departments of MTA SZTAKI, was involved in the development of the SZTAKI Cloud and takes part in more and more cloud-based projects. The LPDS cloud research is focusing on the field of Infrastructure as a Service (IaaS)-based cloud systems to make the previously evolved products and services of LPDS to be available for cloud-based execution in a scalable and transparent way.

Main research areas 

Cloud systems
Scientific gateways for grid and cloud systems
Workflow-based IT solutions
Grid computing, especially Desktop Grids
Interoperability between cloud and grid systems
Resource brokering in cloud systems

Products 

 gUSE (grid and cloud user support environment) is a well-known and permanently improving open source science gateway framework that enables users convenient and easy access to grid and cloud infrastructures. It has been developed to support a large variety of user communities. It provides a general-purpose, workflow-oriented graphical user interface to create and run workflows on various Distributed Computing Infrastructures including clusters, grids, desktop grids, and clouds. The gUSE framework can be used by National Grid Initiatives (NGIs) to support small user communities that cannot afford to develop their own customized science gateway.

P-GRADE Portal is a Liferay technology-based web portal of gUSE. It can be accessed via the major modern web browsers like Chrome, Firefox, etc. It supports the development and submission of distributed applications executed on the computational resources of various distributed computing infrastructures (DCIs) including clusters, service grids, desktop grids, and clouds.

Data Avenue is a file commander tool for data transfer, enabling easy data moving between various storage services over various network protocols. Data Avenue is integrated into WS-PGRADE as a portlet.

The goal of SZTAKI Cloud was to develop and deploy an institutional cloud infrastructure that allows the significant improvement of the traditional institutional IT infrastructure. This new cloud-based infrastructure is significantly more effective and more cost-efficient than the former infrastructure built on traditional conceptions and individual-specific servers.

SZTAKI Desktop Grid provides an enterprise solution to exploit PCs and clusters located at different sites of a company or institute, solving large scale distributed programs via an easy-to-use application programming interface. It is extended to include clusters as single powerful PCs and to hierarchically propagate work from one desktop grid to the other.

Research 

LPDS has participated in national and international grid and cloud research projects since 2000 with outstanding results in the area of grid/cloud resources and in the development of high-level user interfaces. In this field, an important result is the WS-PGRADE/gUSE (used in several European grid), made for accessing grid and cloud systems through a portal in a convenient and user-friendly way.

Additionally, LPDS participates in Big data management and storage within the field of agricultural research.

Ongoing projects with the participation of LPDS:
ENTICE
VIALACTEA
CloudSME
AgroDat

The laboratory maintains a comprehensive list of other projects.

Training 
LPDS has played an active role in providing grid and cloud training in Europe and worldwide. With the national and international training, the Laboratory provides knowledge transfer and targets new users from the industry as well as from science. LPDS organized and hosted summer schools and training on the grid- and cloud-related topics since 2005.

Personnel 
The Head of the LPDS is Prof. Dr. Péter Kacsuk.
The Deputy Head of the LPDS is Dr. Robert Lovas.
1 DSc, 10 PhDs, and over 20 full or part-time members work in the laboratory.

See also 
MTA SZTAKI
gUSE
SZTAKI Desktop Grid
Grid computing
Cloud computing
Big data
P-GRADE Portal

References

External links 
 Laboratory of Parallel and Distributed Systems (LPDS)
 MTA SZTAKI Home Page
 MTA Home Page
 MTA SZTAKI LPDS YouTube channel
 MTA SZTAKI YouTube channel
 MTA SZTAKI LPDS Facebook page

Press appearances 

In English:
 Highlights from the 2012 Summer School in Budapest  (egi.eu, 18/07/2012)
 e-Science Workflows in Budapest  (GridCast, 10/02/2012)
 e-Science Café Roadshow launches in Hungary  (egi.eu, 16/11/2011)
 Wiping out plagiarism (ISGTW, 05/10/2011)
 Hat trick for Alzheimer's grand challenge  (ISGTW, 28/09/2011)
 Desktop grids: Connecting everyone to science (GridBriefings, e-Science Talk, 09/2011)
 Grid computing, the Hungarian way (ISGTW, 15/06/2011)
 DEGISCO Releases Desktop Grids for eScience (HPCwire, 04/02/2011)
 Grids meet aliens and androids (ISGTW, 03/10/2008)

In Hungarian:
 Költségkímélő informatikai megoldás (GyártásTrend, 03/01/2013)
 Demokratizálja a desktop gridet a SZTAKI (hwsw.hu, 30/01/2012)
 Fordítást is figyel a SZTAKI plágiumkeresője (index.hu, 19/01/2012)

Grid computing
Cloud computing
Hungarian Academy of Sciences